Paul Marsh may refer to:
 Paul Marsh (English cricketer)
 Paul Marsh (South African cricketer)
 Paul Marsh (literary agent)
 Paul Marsh (politician)